Captain Barrington Irving Jr. (born November 11, 1983) is a Jamaican-born American pilot who previously held the record for the youngest person to pilot a plane around the world solo, a feat he accomplished in 2007. He is also the first black person and first Jamaican to accomplish this feat. His airplane, a Columbia 400 (Cessna Corvalis 400), is named the "Inspiration", and was manufactured and assembled by the Columbia Aircraft Mfg. Co. in 2005, classified as a standard aircraft in the utility category using over $300,000 in donated parts.

Early life and education

Irving was born in Kingston, Jamaica, where he lived until age the age of six. He grew up in Miami Florida, with parents Barrington Irving and Clovalyn Irving.  Barrington grew up believing college football was his only avenue to higher education. At age 15, Irving met United Airlines Pilot, Captain Gary Robsinson, who took the time to talk to Barrington about his career. Once Barrington discovered aviation as a career possibility, especially the potential income of airline pilots, he had his sight set towards the sky.  

As a student at Miami Northwestern Senior High School, Irving turned down multiple Division 1 football scholarship offers to pursue his passion for flight. Irving graduated from Broward Community College and Florida Memorial University, where he graduated with a Bachelors in Aeronautical Science, Magna Cum Laude. At Florida Memorial University, Irving earned his Private, Commercial and Certified Flight Instructor licenses with an Instrument Rating.

Career
On 23 March 2007, while still an undergrad student at Florida Memorial University, Irving flew a Columbia 400, a single-engine aircraft named "Inspiration", solo around the world. He arrived back on 27 June 2007, having completed the 24,600-mile circumnavigate. Upon completing the trip, Irving, who was 23-years old at the time, became the first black person to circumnavigate the globe and at the time, the youngest person to do so. The completion of the flight earned Barrington a title in the Guinness Book of Records. 

Through his platform, Captain Irving founded The Flying Classroom and Experience Aviation to invest, inspire and empower young professionals in STEM+ and aviation careers. The Flying Classroom, LLC, launched in 2013, is a K 12 integrative STEM+ supplemental curriculum to educate and connect young professionals to STEM+ and aviation careers. Through a proprietary platform, students can explore over 55 STEM-focused global expeditions and have access to 165 interactive and virtual lessons.

In fall of 2022, Irving announced his plans of partnering with industry stakeholders to build an aviation workforce training center in Miami. The training center will aim to increase the number of young professionals in the business aviation industry, with an initial focus on maintenance-related careers. 

Experience Aviation, founded in 2005, is a 501-C3 non-profit organization based at Opa-Locka Executive Airport that utilizes Aviation to build STEM skills in students to address the shortage of STEM professionals by engaging in STEM-related industry challenges. It brings hands-on, project-based, and interactive STEM experiences to the youth, such as building hovercraft, aircraft, and supercars across the nation.

Irving's record was broken in 2012 by 22-year-old Swiss pilot Carlo Schmid, in 2014 by 19-year-old American pilot Matt Guthmiller and in 2022 by 17-year old British-Belgian pilot Mack Rutherford.

In the Media
On October 2022, Titans of Business Aviation, Capt. Barrington Irving and Community Partners announced the Launch of a Business Aviation Professional and Technical Aviation Training Center. 

In 2019, Flying Classroom partnered with Bombardier, Inc. to launch The Flying Classroom Bombardier Academy to familiarize college students, military veterans, and technical school students with business aviation careers in maintenance. 

August 2018, Capt. Irving lands STEM in Opa-locka. Captain Barrington Irving will oversee vocational programming and training for area youth and college students.

Publications
Documenting Irving’s historical global flight and achievements, Scholastic published Captain Barrington’s riveting autobiography, Touch the Sky, which aims to inspire underrepresented kids to pursue their dreams.

Awards and recognition

In 2007, Irving became the first black person to fly solo around the world, a feat which enlisted him in the Guinness Book of World Records. As a celebrated aviator, Barrington has been recognized by leaders like President Barack Obama and has received a Congressional Resolution for his pioneering work in education in technology. In 2012, Irving was recognized as an Emerging Explorer by National Geographic.  Among other honors, Irving holds the NASA Trailblazer Award and the NBAA 2019 American Spirit Award.

Personal Life
Irving currently resides in Miami, Florida with his wife and four children.

Mentorship
Barrington Irving served as a mentor to Shaesta Waiz, the first civilian female commercial pilot from Afghanistan and the record-holder of the 8th woman to fly solo around the world in a single-engine aircraft.

References

External links
Experience Aviation -  includes GPS-enabled flight tracker
uVu -  exclusive video highlights of historic trip; keyword search: Barrington
 Flying Classroom 

1983 births
Living people
Aviators from Florida
Jamaican emigrants to the United States
Jamaican people of American descent
People from Miami
Commanders of the Order of Distinction
American aviation record holders
Broward College alumni